Bruno Caruso (8 August 1927 – 4 November 2018) was an influential Italian artist, graphic designer and writer who spent much of his adult life working in Rome.

Caruso's work focused on the moral, political and ethical flaws of the 20th Century. He fought against influence of Sicilian Mafia in Italian politics, protested against the Vietnam War, campaigned against use of straitjackets in psychiatric wards, and championed the rights of Sicilian farmers in their battle for land ownership in the aftermath of World War II.

Over the course of his career he created more than 25 collections of drawings, founded celebrated Sicilian cultural magazines, Sicilia and Ciclope, and illustrated works by Machiavelli, Kafka, Leonardo Sciascia, Giovanni Arpino and Giuseppe Ungaretti amongst many others.

Caruso's work has ended up in the collections of notable 20th-century patrons of the arts, including Helena Rubenstein, Arthur Jeffress and Irene Brin. In 1993 he was designated a 'commander' of the Order of Merit of the Italian Republic, and in 2001 he received the Gold Medal of Merit for Culture and Art from the president of Italy. He was a member of the prestigious Accademia di San Luca.

Life and works

Early life and education (1927-1948) 

Bruno Caruso was born in Palermo, on August 8, 1927, to Giuseppe Caruso and Maria Cucco. As a child he learned to draw under the tutelage of his father, mainly copying the work of classical masters like Leonardo da Vinci, Pisanello and Andrea Mantegna. His first collection of drawings was completed at age 5 (1931–32); a bestiary featuring 'Il Cane' (1932), a meticulously crafted drawing of a dog, textured by needlepoint (see image).

Caruso's early influences were the famous Orto botanico di Palermo and Monreale Cathedral, but as the Second Italo-Ethiopian War, Spanish Civil War and eventually World War II ignited, he turned his attention to depicting the horror and isolation of war. At age 19 he left Italy for the second time to visit Munich and the Kunsthistorisches Museum in Vienna, where he was profoundly affected by the work of Gustav Klimt and George Grosz.

Immediately after the end of World War II, Caruso signed up to study law at the University of Palermo. He earned a living by writing dissertations for exchange students, and claimed to have submitted over 100 successful papers during his time at the university. Having completed his own law degree, he began a second degree in Classics, but dropped out following a dispute over the faculty's decision to award an honorary degree to a notorious (but unnamed) Sicilian-American celebrity.

In 1948 Caruso took his first trip to Prague where, confronted by the Nazi atrocities of World War II, he completed his first official collection entitled "Deutschland über alles", after George Grosz.

Artistic director, editor and graphic designer 
In 1953 Caruso received a commission from the Sicilian Government to create Sicilia, a magazine series celebrating Sicilian art and culture. As Artistic Director, Caruso was charged with setting up one of the first modern printing presses in Sicily, and forging strong relationships with artists, intellectuals and photographers from around the world, including Richard Avedon, Herbert List and Brassai. In 1974 the magazine created a special edition in honour of Caruso, featuring a bespoke cover and 117 of his drawings.

The early success of Sicilia caught the eye of Irene Brin and Gaspero del Corso, founders of the Galleria dell'Obelisco in Rome, a famous hub for Italy's artistic elite. Caruso became the director of the gallery's publishing arm and struck up close friendships with poets De Liberto, Giuseppe Ungaretti and Leonardo Sinisgalli, and painters Ben Shahn, Fabrizio Clerici, Colombotto Rosso and Renzo Vespignani.

He also published the first books on The Triumph of Death (Palermo), Italian sculptor Giacomo Serpotta and German photographer Wilhelm von Gloeden.

Breakthrough (1952–1956) 
Caruso's association with the Galleria dell'Obelisco led to his first major solo show in 1953, followed by his first monograph in 1954, curated by Leonardo Sinisgalli. The collection made Caruso's name internationally, featuring what Sinisgalli labelled "a tiny universe of jugglers, sleep-walkers, acrobats, time-wasters, street urchins and craftsmen darting around cheerfully like fish caught in the net of a tragic, silent and unstable world",

He had his first solo show in London at the Arthur Jeffress Gallery in 1955, and saw his work appear in the collections of celebrated patrons of the arts across the United States like Helena Rubenstein, Larry Aldrich, Richard Avedon, Walter Bareiss, Eric Estorick, Joan Whitney Payson, Stanley J. Seeger and John Hay Whitney.

Political drawings (1948–1973) 

Back in Sicily, Caruso struck up a friendship with Girolamo Li Causi, leader of the Italian Communist Party, and began actively supporting the local peasant revolts. He completed a collection on the Portella della Ginestra massacre, and campaigned actively for the cultural emancipation of Sicily against the rise of the Mafia. His fight against the endemic corruption in Italian politics climaxed in the 1970s when he was fighting three concurrent legal cases against Michele Sindona, Giovanni Gioia and Vito Ciancimino.

Throughout the 1950s he worked at Palermo's Psychiatric Hospital (the Real Casa dei Matti di Palermo), producing a damning series of studies highlighting the use of medieval curing techniques and abject conditions in the wards, contributing to a major overhaul of the system. He returned to this theme throughout his career in collections like Manicomio (1969) and La Real Casa dei Matti (1975).

Over the following years Caruso travelled extensively to Iran, India, Thailand and Japan, studying Persian calligraphy and completing a series of drawings on dictatorships, famine, and the threat of nuclear warfare. These drawings formed part of four collections; Il Pugno di ferro / The Iron Fist (1962); Pace in terra / Peace on Earth (1963); Totum procedit ex amore (1964); and La Tigre di carta / The Paper Tiger (1964).

He returned to the United States in the month of the Kennedy assassination, guest of Jack Levine, Tennessee Williams and Ben Shahn. On this trip he completed commissions for Time, Fortune and Life magazines and, inspired by a meeting with Malcolm X, began work on Americana (1968) in which he championed the Civil Rights Movement and stood against the Vietnam War.

The fight against the Vietnam War became one of Caruso's most active political stands. He was invited to Hanoi by Phạm Văn Đồng, the prime minister of the Democratic Republic of Vietnam, and edited four books in support of their plight, including Vietnam: Biographia e documenti sull'aggressione imperialistica contro il popolo Vietnamita (1972). In 1972 he illustrated the last testament of Ho Chi Minh.

Death (2018) 

Bruno Caruso died on 4 November 2018 at the Regina Margherita hospice in Rome. He was 91 years old. Days before his death his son, Roberto Caruso, gave him a pencil and paper and, despite having refused to work for almost two years, he completed one final drawing; a melted, disfigured face (see image).

Museum collections
 Bruno Caruso at the Galleria Nazionale d'Arte Moderna
 Bruno Caruso at the Walker Art Center
 Bruno Caruso at the Saint Louis Art Museum
 Bruno Caruso at the National Gallery of Victoria
 Bruno Caruso at the Detroit Institute of Arts
 Bruno Caruso at the Brooklyn Museum
 Bruno Caruso at the WLD Foundation
 Portrait by Sanford H. Roth at the Art Institute of Chicago
 Portrait by Sanford H. Roth at the Los Angeles County Museum of Art

Honours

Key collections

Key monographs

Exhibitions (1950–1965) 

 1951 — Palermo, Galleria Zabara: Sicilian Painters
 1951 — Palermo, Giovane Sicilia: Contemporary Painters
 1952 — Palermo, La Serenella: Bruno Caruso
 1952 — Palermo, Galleria Arcobaleno: Bruno Caruso
 1954 — Rome, Galleria dell'Obelisco: Joie de Vivre
 1954 — Rome, Galleria dell'Obelisco: Bruno Caruso
 1954 — Venice, Venice Biennale
 1954 — Rome, Galleria dell'Obelisco: 5 Painters, 5 Sculptors, American Federation of Arts
 1954 — Cincinnati, Cincinnati Museum of Modern Art: Young Italian Painters
 1954 — Wakefield, Wakefield City Art Gallery: Contemporary Italian Art
 1955 — US Tour, 20 Imaginary Views of the American Scene by 20 Italian Artists
 1955 — Rome, Galleria dell'Obelisco: Around the World
 1955 — London, Arthur Jeffress Gallery: Bruno Caruso
 1955 — Venice, Third Esso Prize
 1955 — Milan, Galleria del Sole: Paintings & Drawings by Bruno Caruso
 1955 — Rome, VII Rome Quadriennale
 1955 — Prato, 60 Masters for the Next 30 Years
 1955 — Minnesota, Weisman Art Museum: Contemporary Italian Art
 1955 — Sydney, L'Obelisco of Rome at David Jones
 1956 — Rome, Galleria dell'Obelisco: Bruno Caruso
 1956 — Zurich, Galerie H.U. Gasser: Bruno Caruso
 1956 — London, Tate Gallery: Modern Italian Art
 1956 — Turin, Galleria la Bussola: Bruno Caruso
 1956 — Venice, Galleria del Cavallino: Bruno Caruso
 1957 — Rome, Galleria d'Arte Moderna: In support of Exiled Hungarian Artists
 1958 — Palermo, Galleria Flaccovio: Bruno Caruso
 1958 — Milan, La Permanente: Young Italian Artists
 1958 — London, Arthur Jeffress Gallery: Bruno Caruso
 1958 — Rome, Galleria dell'Obelisco: Bruno Caruso
 1958 — Berlin, Akademie Der Kunst: Italienische Kunst Am XX Jahrhundert
 1958 — Paris, Galerie d'Art Moderne: Paris Biennale
 1959 — Lima, Pintura Italiana
 1959 — Rome, Galleria dell'Obelisco: Bruno Caruso
 1959 — San Francisco, Museum of Modern Art: Italy Three Directions
 1959 — Pisa, Contemporary Italian Graphic Work
 1959 — Paris, Galerie Rive Gauche: Bruno Caruso
 1959 — Pasadena, Pasadena Art Museum: 20th Century Art of Italy
 1960 — Parma, Galleria del Teatro: Bruno Caruso
 1960 — Rome, Galleria dell'Obelisco: Bruno Caruso, New York Drawings
 1961 — Rome, Galleria Chiurazzi: 7 works by Bruno Caruso
 1961 — São Paulo, Galleria Sistina: Bruno Caruso
 1961 — Modena, Sala Comunale: Bruno Caruso
 1961 — Genoa, Galleria San Matteo: Bruno Caruso
 1961 — Rome, Galleria dell'Obelisco: The Sculptures of Bruno Caruso
 1961 — Rome, Galleria Il Torcoliere: Bruno Caruso, Drawings, Etchings, Lithographs
 1961 — Rome, Galleria dell'Obelisco: Against Nazism
 1961 — Naples, Galleria Il Centro: Bruno Caruso
 1961 — Milan, Galleria la Colonna: Bruno Caruso
 1962 — Rome, Libreria al Ferro di Cavallo: Bruno Caruso, Pugno di Ferro
 1962 — Bologna, Galleria Bianco e Nero: Bruno Caruso
 1962 — Milan, Galleria Hoepli: Don't Forget
 1962 — New York, ACA Gallery: Italian Art Today
 1963 — Tokyo, Institute of Culture: Bruno Caruso and Franco Gentilini
 1963 — Rome, Galleria Don Chiscotte: Bruno Caruso
 1963 — Milan, Galleria Gianferrari: Bruno Caruso
 1963 — Bari, Galleria La Panchetta: Bruno Caruso
 1963 — New York, D'Arcy Gallery: Italian Drawing Today
 1963 — Alexandria, V Biennale of the Mediterranean
 1963 — Hamburg, Copenhagen: Junge Italienische Malerei
 1963 — Rome, Galleria Don Chiscotte: Masters of Italian Painting
 1963 — Rome, Galleria Sistina: Inauguration of 1963/64 Program
 1964 — Palermo, Arte al Borgo: Bruno Caruso
 1964 — Ferrara, Galleria Bigoni: Bruno Caruso
 1964 — Rome, ACA Gallery: Bruno Caruso
 1964 — Rome, Galleria Il Fante di Spade: New Italian Drawings
 1964 — Milan, Galleria 32: Caruso, Guttuso, Porzano
 1964 — Padua, Galleria Interni: Bruno Caruso
 1964 — Moscow, Exhibition of 6 Graphic Artists
 1964 — Rome, Galleria Penelope: Anthology of Drawings and Etchings
 1965 — Rome, Galleria Bianco e Nero: Bruno Caruso
 1965 — Milan, Galleria 32: Bruno Caruso
 1965 — Turin, Galleria l'Approdo: Paintings of Bruno Caruso
 1965 — Bari, Galleria la Panchetta: Graphic work of Bruno Caruso
 1965 — Caltanissetta, Graphic work of Bruno Caruso
 1965 — Rome, Palazzo delle Espozizioni: Quadriennale d'Arte
 1965 — Rome,  ANPPIA: Anti fascism and Resistance
 1965 — Milan, La Permanente: Biennale di Milano
 1965 — Florence, Palazzo Strozzi: XVII National Exhibition, Fiorino Award
 1965 — Parma, The Scalarini National Award for Political Drawings

References

Writers from Palermo
Painters from Palermo
20th-century Italian male artists
Italian graphic designers
1927 births
2018 deaths
Italian contemporary artists
Italian resistance movement members
20th-century Italian painters
Italian male painters